The Rise and Fall of ECW is a 2005 direct-to-video documentary produced by World Wrestling Entertainment (WWE). It chronicles the history of Philadelphia-based professional wrestling promotion Extreme Championship Wrestling. The documentary features interviews with various performers who worked in the promotion including co-founder and former owner Paul Heyman as well as performers Tazz, Tommy Dreamer, Dawn Marie, Stevie Richards, Mick Foley, Chris Jericho, Lance Storm, Rey Mysterio, Eddie Guerrero, Chris Benoit, Rob Van Dam, Rhyno, Nunzio, Spike Dudley, Bubba Ray Dudley and D'Von Dudley. The documentary also featured interviews with ECW rival company executives, WWE Chairman Vince McMahon and former WCW Senior Vice President Eric Bischoff.  A book with the same title was published by WWE and Pocket Books in 2006, with much of the same information and interviews from the DVD transcribed and included. A 2.5 hour version of The Rise and Fall of ECW is available on demand, on the WWE Network.

Reception
Wrestling Observer Newsletter awarded the DVD the "Best Pro Wrestling DVD" of 2005.

See also
Forever Hardcore

References

External links 
 

2004 films
Extreme Championship Wrestling
Direct-to-video professional wrestling films
WWE Home Video
Professional wrestling documentary films
2000s English-language films